Eliahou Hazan Synagogue was a synagogue in Alexandria, Egypt on the former Rue Belzoni. The synagogue was named after Rabbi Eliahou Hazan, the chief rabbi of Alexandria from 1888 to 1908. Established in 1937, it closed in 1958. It, along with many other synagogues, was later sold by the Jewish community of Alexandria in 1995.

See also
History of the Jews in Egypt
List of synagogues in Egypt

References 

Synagogues in Alexandria